Club Xuventude Baloncesto is a basketball team based in Cambados, Galicia (Spain). The team currently plays in league LEB Plata.

History
Xuventude Cambados was founded by a group of friends in 1976.

In 1999, Xuven promoted to Liga EBA, where it played four seasons before being relegated to Primera División. In 2009, the club came back to Liga EBA and in 2011 it qualified for the promotion playoffs to LEB Plata where, despite completing a 28–2 record in the regular season, it failed in the playoffs after losing in the finals to CE Sant Nicolau.

In its second attempt, Xuven clinched the All-Liga EBA title after ending the whole season with a 21–2 record, thus promoting to LEB Plata. The club remained five seasons in the league before being relegated again to Liga EBA. However, Xuven was demoted to the sixth division after failing to fulfill the requirements to play in Liga EBA.

Sponsorship naming
Conservas Olímpico Cambados: 1986–1988
Albariño Pazo Bayón: 1988–1989
Condes de Albarei: 1991–1993
Centrotiendas Cambados: 1999–2000
Establecimientos Otero: 2000–2013
Conservas de Cambados: 2013–2014
Cambados Cidade Europea do Viño 2017: 2016–2017

Season by season

Trophies and awards

Trophies
Liga EBA: (1)
2012–13

References

External links
Official website

Basketball teams in Galicia (Spain)
Former LEB Plata teams
Basketball teams established in 1978
Former Liga EBA teams